James Cook (also known as James Cook University Hospital) is a railway station on the Esk Valley Line, which runs between  and  via . It is owned by Network Rail and managed by Northern Trains.

History
Plans for the building of a station at the hospital had been discussed for some 25 years, including as part of the, now abandoned, Tees Valley Metro project.

The station was finally given the green light by Middlesbrough Council's planning committee in January 2013, and construction work started in January 2014.

The station cost £2.2 million to build and opened to the public on 18 May 2014. It was officially opened on 18 July 2014 by then Minister of State for Transport, Baroness Kramer.

Facilities

Services

Following the May 2021 timetable change, the station is served by an hourly service between Middlesbrough and Nunthorpe, with two trains per day (excluding Sunday) continuing to Battersby, and six per day (four on Sunday) continuing to Whitby. Most trains continue to Newcastle via Hartlepool. All services are operated by Northern Trains.

Rolling stock used: Class 156 Super Sprinter and Class 158 Express Sprinter

References

External links
 
 

Northern franchise railway stations
Railway stations in Middlesbrough
Railway stations in Great Britain opened in 2014
Railway stations opened by Network Rail